Beit Yosef may refer to:

 Beit Yosef, Israel, a moshav in the Beit She'an Valley
 Beit Yosef (book), a book by Rabbi Joseph Caro
 Badatz Beit Yosef, a kosher certification that follows guidelines of Rabbi Yosef Caro
 Yeshiva Beit Yosef, after Rabbi Yosef Yozel Horowitz, was the name of 30+ Novardok Yeshiva satellites in Poland